List of champions of the 1885 U.S. National Championships (now known as the US Open). The tournament was held from 18 August to 22 August on the outdoor grass courts at the Newport Casino in Newport, Rhode Island. It was the 5th U.S. National Championships and the second Grand Slam tournament of the year.

Finals

Singles

 Richard D. Sears defeated  Godfrey M. Brinley 6–3, 4–6, 6–0, 6–3

Doubles

 Richard D. Sears /  Joseph Clark def.  Henry Slocum /  Percy Knapp 6–3, 6–0, 6–2

References

External links
Official US Open website

 
U.S. National Championships
U.S. National Championships (tennis) by year
U.S. National Championships (tennis)
U.S. National Championships (tennis)